Edmondo Tieghi is an Italian actor.

He appeared in Perdiamoci di vista (1994), directed by Carlo Verdone, L'avvertimento (1980) by Damiano Damiani, Le avventura di Enea (1974) by Franco Rossi, Brillantina rock by Michele Massimo Tarantini, Corte marziale (1973) by Roberto Mauri, Eroi all'inferno (1974) by Aristide Massaccesi,  and Diary of a Roman Virgin (1973) by Joe D'Amato.

He played a Mexican soldier in the western film A Fistful of Dollars (1964), Nino in Rudeness (1975), and the hostage in the restaurant in Day of Violence.

Filmography

Films

 A Fistful of Dollars (1964) as Mexican soldier
 For a Few Dollars More (1965) as 2nd Agua Caliente Villager watching Monco
 Duck, You Sucker (1971) as Member of firing squad
 Fra' Tazio da Velletri (1973) as Lapo De' Pazzi
 Corte marziale (1973) as Presiding Judge
 ven Nuns in Kansas City (1973) as Marrisson Right Hand
 Diary of a Roman Virgin (1973) as Conspirator
 Day of Violence (1977) as Nonno
 El hampa ataca, la policía responde (1977) as Biondo
 Contrólese soldado (1977)
 Il giorno dei cristalli (1978) as Padre Ernesto
 La Cage aux Folles (1978)
 Aspetterò (1978) as Addetto reception
 Deadly Chase (1978) as Civetta
 Brillantina Rock (1979)
 The Warning (1980)
 The Fascist Jew (1980)
 Storia senza parole (1981)
 Il piacere dell'onestà (1982) as Marchetto Fongi
 Il passo falso (1983)
 Caligula's Slaves (1984)
 Uomo contro uomo (1987) as Avvocato Arcuzio
 Perdiamoci di vista (1994) as Arianna's father
 Ustica: una spina nel cuore (2000) as Mr.Kappa
 Soldiers, la historia de Kosovo (2001) as Zoran Jukovic
 L'altra donna (2002)

TV series

References

Bibliography

External links
 

Year of birth unknown
Italian male film actors
Italian male television actors
Male Spaghetti Western actors